Tritonoturris difficilis is a species of sea snail, a marine gastropod mollusc in the family Raphitomidae.

Description
The length of the shell varies between 8 mm and 14 mm.

Distribution
This marine species occurs off the Philippines.

Original description
 Stahlschmidt P., Poppe G.T. & Tagaro S.P. (2018). Descriptions of remarkable new turrid species from the Philippines. Visaya. 5(1): 5-64. page(s): 9, pl. 4 figs 1-3.

References

External links
 Worms Link

difficilis
Gastropods described in 2018